The Sais Quartzite is a geologic formation exposed in the Los Pinos Mountains of central New Mexico.

Description
A few beds are greenish to white. The individual grain size in the beds is generally less than 1mm. The formation is underlain by the Estadio Schist and unconformably overlain by the Blue Springs Formation.

Detrital zircon geochronology a minimum age of 1670 million years (Ma), corresponding to the Statherian period of the Paleoproterozoic.

History of investigation
The formation was originally described as the Sais quartzite by J.T. Stark and E.C. Dapples in 1946 and named for the Sais station of the Santa Fe Railroad near Abo Pass. The formation was first assigned to the Manzano Group in 2006.

See also

 List of fossiliferous stratigraphic units in New Mexico
 Paleontology in New Mexico

References

Geologic groups of New Mexico
Permian formations of New Mexico
Precambrian formations of New Mexico